The Ohole Shem Association was an American organization to promote and foster the study of Hebrew and other Semitic languages and to encourage the study of Jewish history and literature.

History
The association was founded in 1895 by Herman Rosenthal, who was assisted in this work by A. Radin, S. Brainin, and others.

The association hosted series of lectures, in Hebrew, German, and English, on subjects relating to Jewish science. In 1895–96 it published a Hebrew monthly entitled Ner ha-Ma'arabi, and in 1901 Ha-Modia' le-Ḥodashim; for 1904 it issued an annual entitled Yalkut Ma'arabi. In 1901 it celebrated the one hundredth anniversary of the birth of Zacharias Frankel, and in 1903 the seventieth birthday of Baron Horace Günzburg. In 1904 it commemorated the twenty-fifth anniversary of the literary activity of the Hebrew poet , to whom the first volume of the Yalkut Ma'arabi was dedicated.

References
 

1895 establishments in New York City
Jewish organizations established in the 19th century
Learned societies of the United States
Defunct organizations based in New York City